Darrian may refer to:
 The current name of British automobile manufacturer Davrian.
 Racquel Darrian, an American pornographic actress.